Sir Andrew Lusk, 1st Baronet (18 September 1810 – 21 June 1909) was a Scottish born businessman and Liberal politician. He sat in the House of Commons from 1865 to 1885.

Biography
Lusk was the son of John Lusk of Barr, Ayrshire and his wife Margaret Earl. He was Presbyterian and entered business as a merchant and shipowner. He was active in the City of London where he was a director of the Imperial Bank and of the General Fire and Life Assurance Co. He was an alderman and Deputy Lieutenant for the City of London and a J.P. for Middlesex. From 1860 to 1861 he was Sheriff of London and Middlesex.

In 1865 Lusk was elected Member of Parliament for Finsbury. He held the seat until 1885. He was Lord Mayor of London in 1873/74 and was created a baronet, of Colney Park, in 1874 to commemorate the visit of the Emperor of Russia to the city. He was Chairman of the Trustees of Morden College from 1885 to 1896.

Lusk married Eliza Potter, daughter of James Potter of Falkirk, in 1848. He died on 21 June 1909, aged 98, when the baronetcy became extinct.

References

External links

|-

|-

1810 births
1909 deaths
UK MPs 1880–1885
UK MPs 1865–1868
UK MPs 1868–1874
UK MPs 1874–1880
Sheriffs of the City of London
19th-century lord mayors of London
19th-century English politicians
Deputy Lieutenants of the City of London
Baronets in the Baronetage of the United Kingdom
Morden College
Liberal Party (UK) MPs for English constituencies
Burials at Kensal Green Cemetery